Udar may refer to:

 Udār, a village in East Azerbaijan Province, Iran
 Udar revolver, an experimental Russian revolver
 UDAR, Ukrainian political party Ukrainian Democratic Alliance for Reform